Gordon Charles Webber (6 January 1885 – 4 June 1960) was an Australian politician.
Webber was born in Richmond to carpenter Henry Moore Webber and Harriett Bastin. He attended state school in Collingwood and then worked as a saddler. He eventually became a wickerworker, and served as president of the Wickerworkers' Union. On 6 February 1915 he married Doris Edna Brown, with whom he had one son; he would later remarry Maud Glenister on 12 January 1922 and have a further three children. During World War I he served with the 4th Light Horse as a stretcher-bearer. 

Webber joined the Labor Party in 1901, and was president of the state executive from 1910 to 1914 and from 1921 to 1922. He also served on Richmond City Council from 1908 to 1920 and was its first Labor mayor from 1913 to 1915. In 1912 he won a by-election for the Victorian Legislative Assembly seat of Abbotsford (in 1927 he would transfer to Heidelberg). He was a minister without portfolio from July to November 1924 and from 1927 to 1928 and Minister of Sustenance from 1929 to 1932. He lost his seat in 1932 and became a newsagent. He died in Mordialloc in 1960.

References

1885 births
1960 deaths
Australian Labor Party members of the Parliament of Victoria
Members of the Victorian Legislative Assembly
20th-century Australian politicians
People from Richmond, Victoria
Politicians from Melbourne
Australian military personnel of World War I
Military personnel from Melbourne
Victoria (Australia) local councillors